Orion Center for the Study of the Dead Sea Scrolls and Associated Literature is an Israeli research institute affiliated with the Hebrew University of Jerusalem.

History
The Orion Center was established in 1995 as part of the Institute for Jewish Studies at the Hebrew University of Jerusalem. The center engages in study and research of the Dead Sea Scrolls.

Over the years, the center has hosted a series of symposia bringing together many of the world's experts on the scrolls to give papers on topics related to the specific theme of that year's symposium. Past symposia have examined such subjects as the Damascus Document, wisdom literature and the reworking of biblical literature. Many of these symposia have been published by the center.

Since 1999 the Orion Center has held regular seminars relating to the Dead Sea Scrolls in memory of Professor Jonas C. Greenfield. Emanuel Tov gave the inaugural seminar on "The Greek Texts from the Judaean Desert".

References

External links
 The Orion Center for the Study of the Dead Sea Scrolls and Associated Literature.
 The Orion Center Bibliography Search for books, articles, and reviews related to the Dead Sea Scrolls, 1995–present.
 The Orion Center Current Bibliography for the most recent publications on the Scrolls.
 The Orion Center Virtual Qumran Tour.
 A list of past Orion Center Symposia, with links to important scholarly papers on the scrolls.

Archaeological research institutes
Education in Jerusalem
Dead Sea Scrolls
Biblical studies organizations